The 2014 Mexico–Guatemala earthquake struck  west of Puerto Madero on July 7 at 05:23:54. The shock had a moment magnitude of 6.9 and a maximum Mercalli intensity of VII (Very Strong). Collapsed buildings and a heart attack resulted in the deaths of five people and another 12 were injured.

See also
 List of earthquakes in 2014
 List of earthquakes in Guatemala
 List of earthquakes in Mexico

References

External links

2014 earthquakes
2014
2014
2014 in Guatemala
2014 in Mexico
2014 disasters in Mexico